Vice Admiral Sir Peter William Gretton  (27 August 1912 – 11 November 1992) was an officer in the Royal Navy. He was active in the Battle of the Atlantic during the Second World War, and was a successful convoy escort commander. He eventually rose to become Fifth Sea Lord and retired as a vice admiral before entering university life as a bursar and academic.

Early career
Gretton joined the Royal Navy as a cadet at the Royal Naval College, Dartmouth, Dartmouth. He served in the aircraft carrier Courageous before seeing action in the cruiser HMS Durban during the Abyssinia crisis and the Spanish Civil War. He led a landing party in Haifa during the Arab rebellion in Palestine. He attended an anti-submarine course at Portland and, on the outbreak of the Second World War, was assigned to the destroyer HMS Vega as first lieutenant.

Second World War
After a short period as first lieutenant in the old destroyer , from September 1939 to April 1940, Gretton was appointed at very short notice as first lieutenant in the large modern destroyer  and saw action at the Second Battle of Narvik during the Norwegian Campaign. He was given command of the old destroyer  in 1941 and served in the North Atlantic. Promoted to lieutenant-commander on 1 June 1942, he was given command of the marginally newer destroyer  and returned to the Mediterranean. He took part in Operation Pedestal, the Malta convoy operation in August 1942, and sank the Italian submarine Dagabur by ramming. Promoted to commander on 31 December 1942, he was given command of the destroyer , as Senior Officer Escort to Escort Group B7, based in Derry.

Post war
Promoted to captain on 30 June 1948, Gretton became naval assistant to the First Sea Lord and then chief of staff to the senior naval officer at the Joint Services Mission in Washington, D.C., before being given command of the Naval task group for Operation Grapple in 1956. Promoted to rear-admiral on 7 July 1958, he became Senior Naval Member of the Directing Staff at the Imperial Defence College in 1958 and Flag Officer Sea Training in 1960. Promoted to vice-admiral on 10 March 1961, he went on to be Deputy Chief of the Naval Staff and Fifth Sea Lord in 1962. He retired through ill-health in 1963.

Gretton served as the domestic bursar of University College, Oxford, from 1965 until 1971, and became a senior research fellow in 1971. He published widely on defence matters and was the president of the Royal Humane Society. He died on 11 November 1992 at the age of 80.

Gretton was featured talking about his wartime experience on the World at War documentary series, where he appears in Episode 10 "Wolf Pack: U-Boats in the Atlantic (1939–1944)" which was first screened on 9 January 1974.

Works
 Convoy escort commander (1964; memoirs)
 Maritime strategy: a study of British defence problems (1965)
 Former Naval Person: Churchill and the navy (1968) (published as Winston Churchill and the Royal Navy in the US, 1969.)

Honours
Gretton was awarded the Distinguished Service Cross in 1936 and was mentioned in dispatches in 1940. He was appointed an Officer of the Order of the British Empire in the 1941 Birthday Honours. He received the Distinguished Service Order and Two Bars; the first in 1942 for Operation Pedestal; the second in 1943 for the defence of ONS 5; and the third in late 1943 for the actions as support group leader.

For his postwar career he was appointed a Companion of the Order of the Bath in the 1960 New Year Honours and advanced to Knight Commander of the Order of the Bath in the 1963 New Year Honours.

References

Further reading

Reminiscences of Vice-Admiral Sir Peter Gretton - the unpublished memoirs of Admiral Gretton.

|-

1912 births
1992 deaths
British military personnel of the 1936–1939 Arab revolt in Palestine
Companions of the Distinguished Service Order
Knights Commander of the Order of the Bath
Lords of the Admiralty
Officers of the Order of the British Empire
Recipients of the Distinguished Service Cross (United Kingdom)
Royal Navy vice admirals
Royal Navy officers of World War II
Graduates of Britannia Royal Naval College
People from Farnham
Military personnel from Surrey